Graptostethus is a genus in the insect family Lygaeidae (seed bugs). Although originally restricted to the Old World (Palaearctic, Ethiopian, and Oriental Regions) some species like G. servus have spread to parts of the New World.

Species in the genus include:

 Graptostethus apicalis (Dallas, 1852)
 Graptostethus argentatus (Fabricius, 1803)
 Graptostethus cardinalis (Stal, 1867)
 Graptostethus carpenteri Distant, 1918
 Graptostethus dissidens Montandon, 1893
 Graptostethus distanti Reuter, 1887
 Graptostethus electus Distant, 1918
 Graptostethus flammatus Distant, 1918
 Graptostethus grandis Distant, 1901
 Graptostethus guigliai Mancini, 1953
 Graptostethus imperialis Mancini, 1939
 Graptostethus incertus (Walker, 1872)
 Graptostethus incomptus (Herrich-Schaeffer, 1850)
 Graptostethus izzardi Slater, 1964
 Graptostethus nigriceps Stal, 1874
 Graptostethus ocellatus (Montrouzier, 1865)
 Graptostethus parvinotatus Distant, 1918
 Graptostethus pubescens Slater Alex, 1985
 Graptostethus quadrisignatus Distant, 1879
 Graptostethus rufifemoratus (Dallas, 1852)
 Graptostethus rufus Distant, 1918
 Graptostethus septus (Germar, 1837)
 Graptostethus servus Fabricius, 1787
 Graptostethus sternalis (Distant, 1918)
 Graptostethus swynnertoni (Distant, 1915)
 Graptostethus varipictus Slater Alex, 1985
 Graptostethus verticalis (Dallas, 1852)

References

Lygaeidae
Pentatomomorpha genera